Tân Hưng is a rural district (huyện) of Long An province in the Mekong Delta region of Vietnam. As of 2003 the district had a population of 41,813. The district covers an area of 536 km². The district capital lies at Tân Hưng.

Divisions
The district is divided into 10 communes:

Vĩnh Đại
Vĩnh Châu A
Vĩnh Châu B
Vĩnh Lợi
Vĩnh Thạnh
Thạnh Hưng
Hưng Thạnh
Hưng Hà
Hưng Điền
Hưng Điền B

References

Districts of Long An province